The 2017 Scottish Women's Football League First Division, commonly known as SWFL 1, is the second season of the Scottish Women's Football League First Division, the third tier of women's football in Scotland since its reconstruction at the end of the 2015 season.

The leagues are split into two regional divisions of 12 teams each, North and South. The change was made to increase competitiveness in the league. 

Central Girls won the North division and Kilmarnock won the South division. Both were promoted to SWPL 2 for the 2018 season.

SWFL 1 North

Teams

Standings

Results
Scottish Women's Football

SWFL 1 South

Teams

Standings

Results
Scottish Women's Football

References

1
Scot
Scot
Scottish Women's Football League seasons
Wom
Wom